Gerald Lee Smith (born September 20, 1983), better known by his stage-name Nekro G, is an American rapper, song writer, promoter, & record label owner from Riverside, California. He is currently signed to Grim Reality Entertainment, and is the owner of  Wikid Funk Records founded June, 2003.

Biography
Nekro G began writing and recording Hip-Hop music in 1998. At this time he started recording his first mixtape and performing at local Southern California shows with Darryl Bowman who rapped under "Dimesac D", together they formed a rap group called "Sinister-X". In early 2002 they started D&S Records and released a mixtape that was given away for free entitled "Buried Memories". In June 2002 they met a kid Denis Sudar from Pomona who rapped under "Zero", they all clicked and shortly after Zero had joined Sinister-X and the trio began working on an album together entitled "Brain Dead Killaz LP". In February 2003, the group released "Buried Memories 2" of cuts that were not going on the main cd, it was also given away for free at shows. In June 2003 Sinister-X released "Brain Dead Killaz LP" and even went as far as to press a small quantity of physical cds professionally, however the day the album dropped all 3 members had inner conflict with each other and the group was disbanded and has never been reformed since. However in 2018 on Halloween Nekro G, Dimesac D and Ras Al Ghoul put out Track, Which was Followed up by another Track Featuring Nekro G, Dimesac D, Ras Al Goul, and DocWicked.

In July 2003, Nekro G formed his own music label, Wikid Funk Records and began recording a frenzy of new music. Since that time, he has released over 40 mixtapes, including 8 official solo album mixtapes, 10 Rant's & Ravings mixtapes, various group projects, and countless features and collaborations with other artists. Wikid Funk Records has had a revolving door of underground artists. Nekro G has played numerous underground shows in Southern California, including being featured on an opening set at the Key club in Los Angeles for The Twiztid and KMK's "Chaos and Chronic Tour" in 2012. He also played for both Westcoast Wickidfest shows (thrown by Grim Reality Entertainment and Netherworld Records and featuring Hopsin, Scum, Insane Poetry, Smallz One and JP Tha Hustler). In 2010, Nekro G was named RapChamp.com winner of their 2010 Rap Competition.

In 2010, Nekro G won The Rap Champ, Championship at rapchamp.com (site no longer exist). 

In early 2011, JP Tha Hustler collaborated with Nekro G for the song "Dogg." JP was happy with the song and signed Nekro G to Grim Reality Entertainment; the song later appeared on Nekro G's debut EP. On June 19, 2011 Nekro G released his first professional CD on Grim Reality Entertainment, entitled "Real, Raw, Rap EP".

In late December 2011 Nekro G released his first single for his next record, as well as his first real music video on YouTube, entitled "Take The Trash Out" Nekro G also appeared multiple times on the Grim Reality compilation entitled "New Breed" that was released on December 5, 2011.

Nekro G released a full-length LP for Grim Reality Entertainment, entitled "Reel Street Musik" on October 13, 2012 at his CD Release Show in Riverside. It Featured collaborations with SlyzWicked, Sonny Jonez, JP Tha Hustler, and Insane Poetry.

In October 2012 Nekro G was named "Best Hip Hop Artist in IE of 2012" in I.E. Weekly.

On October 31, 2012, Nekro G and Fellow Underground Artist Spek One, Dr. Edrum & SlyzWicked collectively released a new double LP mixtape entitled "Moodswing'n Vol.1" for free download on datpiff.com

In early 2013, Nekro G was featured in an article in Horrorcore Magazine.

On July 18, 2013 "Grim Reality Entertainment's Skull & Cross Mics" Compilation dropped in stores nationwide, under a distribution deal with Long Range and EOne/Koch. In October 2013 he was featured numerous times on the GRE compilation "Dark Scriptures". In November 2013, he then released his 3rd GRE Release "Beyond Beast LP" and had been playing numerous shows with bigger named artist such as Twiztid and Ces Cru.

April 20, 2014 marked the release of his new group "Godpawn" with partner Mulligan and their album "I.M.M.O.D" (an acronym for 'I Make My Own Destiny') which was put out by Anti-Authority Records and Freedom Union Records. The album features appearances by Strange Music's Ces Cru, Esham, Twisted Insane, Madchild, Delusional, and Kung Fu Vampire.

Nekro G released a single "I Will Kxll Ya'll" in August 2014, and his new record "Thought Crimes" on October 4, 2014, both featuring Playboy The Beast.

On January 1, 2015 Nekro G was Featured multiple times on Grim Reality Entertainments "Westcoast Heatwave" CD, later in 2015 he was Big Legion's album "Crown Town Villain" on the track "Numb". In 2016, he was featured on the Grim Reality Entertainment "Remixes" Compilation and was on Slyzwicked's "Silent Assassin" on 3 separate tracks.

In 2017, Nekro G Put out the Digital Single "There She Go" & a Remix & Collaborations CD, featuring some new content.

In 2018, Nekro G Put out 2 new Digital Singles "Too Raw Feat. Grewsum & Nitro, Both off a rumored upcoming album.

It was in mid 2018 that Nekro G began Branching off and working as a studio artist and Ghostwriter, Since then he has been featured on numerous other CD's & singles by various other artist.

In January 2019, Miniminter, Of the Youtube group Sidemen, Posted a video of Nekro G dissing the Sidemen in a Rap, the video has to date garnered over 4 Million Views. The song was also posted separately on Miniminters 2nd Channel "MM7Gaming" is now sitting at over 1 Million views.

In 2020, Nekro G Dissed Youtubers "AmandaTheJedi" and "Mister GG" on their respective channels.

Personal life
Nekro G graduated from Glendora High School and attended Citrus College for music production. He currently resides in Riverside, Ca. He is married and also has two daughters.
He is a strong supporter of the hip hop movement.

Discography

Studio albums
 2011: Nekro G – Real, Raw, Rap EP
 2012: Nekro G – Reel Street Musik LP
 2013: Nekro G - Beyond Beast LP
 2014: Nekro G - Thought Crimes
 2017: Nekro G - Remixes & Collaborations
 2023: Lost Boys - TBA

Digital Singles
 2011: Take The Trash Out
 2011: Army of Darkness Remix
 2011: West Kills It Feat. Mad Choppa 
 2014: I Will Kxll Ya'll Remix Feat. JP Tha Hustler & Playboy The Beast
 2015: I'ma Eat Remix Feat. JP Tha Hustler & Donnie Menace
 2016: Now You Know Feat. Speak One & JP Tha Hustler
 2017: Murder Spree Feat. Speak One & JP Tha Hustler
 2017: Bloodspray Remix Feat. Smallz One & JP Tha Hustler
 2017: There She Go
 2018: Nitro
 2018: Too Raw Feat. Grewsum
 2019: Stop Sfera
 2019: Seeing Things
 2019: SIDEMEN DISS TRACK (Youtube Exclusive)
 2019: Hell Yeah
 2019: Black & White
 2019  Issues (Remix)
 2019: Beyond Beast (Lupah Phaiym Remix)
 2019: Da Fantom (Lupah Phaiym Remix)
 2021: Ya Heard Of Us! Feat. Killa Gabe, JP Tha Hustler, Slyzwicked, & Liquid Assassin.

Studio Albums Featured on
 2011: Tha Ghost – Amerika's Most Hated (Directors Cut) 2011: Grim Reality Entertainment – New Breed Compilation 2012: Taab Frio – Put it on My Taab EP 2012: VD – Hardcore Hip Hop LP 2012: JP Tha Hustler – 100% Hardcore LP 2013: Spitz - Mcmxviii LP 2013: Slyz Wicked - Only The Strong Survive LP 2013: Dr Edrum - Who They Come to Party With? EP 2013: Killa Gabe - From Tha Guttas of Mighty Sac LP 2013: Grim Reality Entertainment – Skull & Cross Mics Compilation 2013: Spek One & Two Cees - Go Getter Gang LP 2013: JP Tha Hustler - No Pressure LP 2013: B Muné - Instant Fans Just Add Music LP 2013: Grim Reality Entertainment - Dark Scriptures Compilation 2013: Uncle Phoenix - The Rebirth 2014: Cali G - G Classic LP 2014: Dr. Edrum - Foot in The Door LP 2014: SlyzWicked - It Lives Within LP 2014: Godpawn - I.M.M.O.D. LP 2014: Spek One - Nothing To Prove LP 2014: TwoCees - Magnifique Manifesto LP 2014: JP Tha Hustler - Dissinfekted LP 2014: Insane Poetry - Killaborations 
 2015: Grim Reality Entertainment - Westcoast Heatwave Compilation 2015: JP Tha Hustler - Mad Scientist LP 2015: Big Legion - Crown Town Villain LP 2016: SlyzWicked - Silent Assassin 2016: Grim Reality Entertainment - The Remixes 2017: JP Tha Hustler & SlyzWicked - BeastMode LP 2017: JP Tha Hustler - Remixes & Collaborations 2018: Mad Choppa - Chopera 2018: Insane Poetry & JP Tha Hustler - Team Guillotine 2018: Benny Charles - Rhythm, Blues, & Gospel: A Story of Love, Hope, & Faith 2018: Right Sight Productions / Various Artist - Letting Go 2018: Grim Reality Entertainment - We Are Hip Hop 2018: JP Tha Hustler - Halloween Horror Mix 2018: JP Tha Hustler - Powerlifting Hardcore Workout Mix 2 2018: JP Tha Hustler - MMA Workout Mix 2018: JP Tha Hustler - Hard Rock & Hip Hop 2018: JP Tha Hustler - Powerlifting Hardcore Workout Mix 2018: EmeryTheArtist - Dreamstate 2018: Various Artist - Letting Go! 2018: DJ Mystic - Oblivion 2019: What is That - What Is That 2019: Benny Charles - Rhythm, Blues, & Gospel: A Story of Love, Hope, 7 Faith 2019: Penta - Inside My Head 2019: Collective - What is that 2019: Freddex - A Haunted House 2019: Centurion - Kiss My Diss 2019: YomiShious - Split Personality 2019: Twarlex - Beware of the Leopard 2019: D00f - Fear 2019: Choatic Hostility - First Rule No Rules 2019: Halloween Hope - Party Music 2019: Grim Reality Entertainment - Trap Music 2019: Lupah Phaiym Remixes Vol. 2 2019: Encoded Files: StreetScape, Vol.1 2019: Beastmode Warriors - Art of War 2020: Beastmode Warriors - Apex Predators 2020: Beastmode Warriors - Warhammer (Remixes) 2020: Grim Singmuf - Deviant Dialect 2020: Grim Singmuf - Immaculate Cacophony 2020: Grim Singmuf - Existence 2021: Armada The Producer - Last of The Assassins 
 2021: XoBrooklynne - My Crown The Album 2021: JP Tha Hustler - The Amazing Hustler-Man, Vol.1 2021: Beastmode Warriors - Way of The Warrior 2022: Luna Carina - Lily 2022: Beastmode Warriors - Beastmode WickedDigital Singles Featured on
 2016: Fat D - Not Too Long Ago Single Feat. Nekro G 2016: Madd Locc - Run it Feat. Nekro G, A.N.T. & Don Orias 2017: Jay Spark - Boiling Point Feat. Nekro G & Slyzwicked (Remastered) 2018: YomiShious - Radiate Feat. Nekro G 2018: Klem - Aesthetic Feat. Nekro G 2019: Legna Zeg - Black & White Feat. Nekro G 2019: Pax Vici - F*cking Fish Feat. Nekro G 2019: Prof. G - Push It Harder Feat. Nekro G  2019: The Chalkeaters - Bowsette Feat. M-G UniNew & Nekro G 2019: Stone Troll - The Conspiracist Feat. Nekro G 2019: Not Uncomplicated - This World is Mine Feat. Nekro G 2019: Nick Will - Till the Grave Feat. Nekro G 2019: Grim Singmuf - Music Medicinals Feat. Nekro G 2019: Grim Singmuf - Datura Tea Feat. Nekro G 2022: Alias Molombo - Zombie Party Crush Feat A-F-R-O & Nekro G 2022: Luna Carina - Eager to Gain Feat. Jasmin Tietze, King Marino & Nekro G 2022: Beastmode Warriors - Bullet 2 My Brain Feat. Scum & Nekro G 2022: Skull & Crossmics 2022 Cypher, Pt.1Mixtapes
 2002: Sinister-X  – Buried Memories 2003: Sinister-X  – Buried Memories 2 2003: Sinister-X  – Brain Dead Killaz LP 2005: Nekro G – Dark Prophecies LP 2005: Nekro G – Rants and Ravings 1 2006: Nekro G – Psychotic Poetry LP 2007: Nekro G – Rants and Ravings 2 2007: IllLogical Madness (Nekro G & VD) – Open Mind Surgery LP  2007: Nekro G – Rants and Ravings 3 2008: Nekro G – Rants and Ravings 4 2008: Nekro G – Straight out The Pen LP 2008: Nekro G – Rants and Ravings 5 2008: Satans Sick Symphony LP(Nekro G, VD, Dr Ed, Tha Burden) – (Self Titled) 2009: SWK Rydaz(Nekro G, VD, Dr Ed, Tha Burden) – Jack Yo Shyt LP 2009: Nekro G – Rants and Ravings 6 2009: Nekro G – Final Chapter LP 2009: Nekro G – Rants and Ravings 7 2009: IllLogical Madness – Absurd Thoughtz LP 2009: Nekro G – Rants and Ravings 8 2009: The Gruntz LP – (Self Titled) 2010: Nekro G – Rants and Ravings 9 2010: Nekro G – Rants and Ravings 10 2010: SWK Rydaz – Talkin Shyt LP 2010: Satans Sick Symphony (Nekro G, VD, Dr Ed, Tha Burden) – Solo's & Sililoquys 2010: SWK Rydaz – Fuck Yo Shyt LP 2010: Nekro G – New Revelationz LP 2010: Nekro G – Rants and Ravings 11 2010: Nekro G – Street Soldier LP 2011: Nekro G – Torn Scriptures LP 2011: Nekro G – Rants and Ravings 12 2011: Riv Rydaz LP (Nekro G & Sonny Jonez) – (Self Titled) 2011: Nekro G – West Coast OG LPWikid Funk Mixtapes Featured on
 2009: Tha Burden – Tha Mutha Fxckin LP 2009: VD – Infected LP 2009: Dr Ed – The Dr I Sin LP 2009: Arkham Rejects – Out the Asylum LP 2009: VD Presents – Tha Gruesome & Grotesque LP 2010: Somoan Sweet Thang – Pimp Canes & Cocaine LP 2010: Sons of Sam – Sons of Killaz LP 2010: Wikid Funk Skunk LP: The Smokers CD 2010: Bonified LP – (Self titled)Other Mixtapes Featured on
RapChamp Championship Series Mixtape Vol.2

 2007: Xplicit – Parental Advisory 2007: Psypher – O.C. Soulja 2012: Moodswing'n Vol. 1 (Double Disc LP) 2013: Young Murdoc - Kali Kush Mixtape Vol 2 2013: Mista Creepz - Smoke & Mirrors 2015: J-Pegs - The Meaning Of Life 2016: J-Pegs - 10 Rings 2016: J-Pegs - Red Hot 2016: J-Pegs - Captain Pegs 3 2016: J-Pegs - The Meaning of Life 2 2017: J-Pegs - PEGNO 2017: Ghetto-T Trapped in the 419 2018: J-Pegs - Dirty Pepsi 6 2018: J-Pegs - Flannel God 2018: J-Pegs - Captain Pegs 11 2019: Earworm Entertainment- Mixtape Vol. 3''

Accolades
 Part of GRE when Winning Best Hip Hop Label in IE 2013 - IE Weekly
 Best Hip Hop Artist in IE 2012 – IE Weekly
 2010 Rap Champ – RapChamp.com

References

1983 births
Living people
Musicians from Riverside, California
Rappers from California
American male rappers
21st-century American rappers
21st-century American male musicians